The Roman Catholic Diocese of Colatina is a diocese located in the city of Colatina in the Ecclesiastical province of Vitória in Brazil.

History
 23 April 1990: Established as Diocese of Colatina from the Metropolitan Archdiocese of Vitória

Leadership
 Bishops of Colatina (Roman rite)
 Bishop Geraldo Lyrio Rocha (later Archbishop) (1990.04.23 – 2002.01.16)
 Bishop Décio Zandonade, S.D.B. (2003.05.14 – 2014.05.14)
 Bishop Joaquim Wladimir Lopes Dias (2015.03.04 – 2021.01.13)
 Bishop Lauro Sérgio Versiani Barbosa (2021.10.27 – present)

References
 GCatholic.org
 Catholic Hierarchy
 Diocese website (Portuguese) 

Roman Catholic dioceses in Brazil
Christian organizations established in 1990
Colatina, Roman Catholic Diocese of
Roman Catholic dioceses and prelatures established in the 20th century